Gąsiorowo  is a village in the administrative district of Gmina Purda, within Olsztyn County, Warmian-Masurian Voivodeship, in northern Poland.

Before 1945 the village was German-settled and part of the German state of Prussia.  During the Nazi campaign of changing placenames to remove traces of Slavic origin, it was renamed Lichtenstein. The village was renamed to the reconstructed historic name Gąsiorowo in post-war Poland in 1945.

References

Villages in Olsztyn County